Jenette Maitz (born December 7, 1987) is an American former competitive ice dancer. In 2009, she teamed up with Turkish skater Alper Uçar, coached by Natalia Dubova. They won the Turkish national title and represented Turkey at the 2010 World Championships, placing 26th.

Competitive highlights

Programs

References 

1987 births
Living people
American female ice dancers
Turkish female ice dancers
21st-century American women